This is a list of members of the 14th Bundestag – the lower house of parliament of the Federal Republic of Germany, whose members were in office from 1998 until 2002.



Summary 
This summary includes changes in the numbers of the five caucuses (CDU/CSU, SPD, Greens, FDP, Party of Democratic Socialism):

Members

A 
 Ulrich Adam, CDU
 Brigitte Adler, SPD
 Ilse Aigner, CSU
 Ina Albowitz, FDP
 Peter Altmaier, CDU
 Gila Altmann, Bündnis 90/Die Grünen
 Gerd Andres, SPD
 Ingrid Arndt-Brauer, SPD
 Rainer Arnold, SPD
 Dietrich Austermann, CDU

B 
 Hermann Bachmaier, SPD
 Ernst Bahr, SPD
 Monika Balt, PDS
 Doris Barnett, SPD
 Hans-Peter Bartels, SPD
 Eckhardt Barthel, SPD
 Klaus Barthel, SPD
 Norbert Barthle, CDU
 Dietmar Bartsch, PDS
 Wolf Bauer, CDU
 Günter Baumann, CDU
 Brigitte Baumeister, CDU
 Marieluise Beck, Bündnis 90/Die Grünen
 Volker Beck, Bündnis 90/Die Grünen
 Ingrid Becker-Inglau, SPD
 Angelika Beer, Bündnis 90/Die Grünen
 Wolfgang Behrendt, SPD
 Meinrad Belle, CDU
 Axel Berg, SPD
 Sabine Bergmann-Pohl, CDU
 Otto Bernhardt, CDU
 Matthias Berninger, Bündnis 90/Die Grünen
 Hans-Werner Bertl, SPD
 Grietje Bettin, Bündnis 90/Die Grünen
 Friedhelm Beucher, SPD
 Hans-Dirk Bierling, CDU
 Wolfgang Bierstedt, PDS
 Petra Bierwirth, SPD
 Rudolf Bindig, SPD
 Lothar Binding, SPD
 Joseph-Theodor Blank, CDU
 Renate Blank, CSU
 Petra Bläss, PDS
 Heribert Blens, CDU
 Peter Bleser, CDU
 Norbert Blüm, CDU
 Antje Blumenthal, CDU
 Kurt Bodewig, SPD
 Friedrich Bohl, CDU
 Maria Böhmer, CDU
 Sylvia Bonitz, CDU
 Jochen Borchert, CDU
 Wolfgang Börnsen, CDU
 Wolfgang Bosbach, CDU
 Wolfgang Bötsch, CSU
 Maritta Böttcher, PDS
 Klaus Brähmig, CDU
 Klaus Brandner, SPD
 Anni Brandt-Elsweier, SPD
 Willi Brase, SPD
 Ralf Brauksiepe, CDU
 Hildebrecht Braun, FDP
 Eberhard Brecht, SPD
 Paul Breuer, CDU
 Bernhard Brinkmann, SPD
 Rainer Brinkmann, SPD
 Hans-Günter Bruckmann, SPD
 Rainer Brüderle, FDP
 Monika Brudlewsky, CDU
 Georg Brunnhuber, CDU
 Klaus Bühler, CDU
 Eva Bulling-Schröter, PDS
 Edelgard Bulmahn, SPD
 Annelie Buntenbach, Bündnis 90/Die Grünen
 Ulla Burchardt, SPD
 Ernst Burgbacher, FDP
 Michael Bürsch, SPD
 Hans Martin Bury, SPD
 Hans Büttner, SPD
 Hartmut Büttner, CDU
 Dankward Buwitt, CDU

C 
 Cajus Julius Caesar, CDU
 Manfred Carstens, CDU
 Peter Harry Carstensen, CDU
 Marion Caspers-Merk, SPD
 Wolf-Michael Catenhusen, SPD
 Roland Claus, PDS

D 
 Peter Danckert, SPD
 Herta Däubler-Gmelin, SPD
 Leo Dautzenberg, CDU
 Wolfgang Dehnel, CDU
 Christel Deichmann, SPD
 Hubert Deittert, CDU
 Ekin Deligöz, Bündnis 90/Die Grünen
 Albert Deß, CSU
 Renate Diemers, CDU
 Amke Dietert-Scheuer, Bündnis 90/Die Grünen
 Wilhelm Dietzel, CDU
 Karl Diller, SPD
 Thomas Dörflinger, CDU
 Hansjürgen Doss, CDU
 Marie-Luise Dött, CDU
 Peter Dreßen, SPD
 Rudolf Dreßler, SPD
 Thea Dückert, Bündnis 90/Die Grünen
 Detlef Dzembritzki, SPD
 Dieter Dzewas, SPD

E 
 Peter Eckardt, SPD
 Sebastian Edathy, SPD
 Heidemarie Ehlert, PDS
 Ludwig Eich, SPD
 Maria Eichhorn_(politician), CSU
 Franziska Eichstädt-Bohlig, Bündnis 90/Die Grünen
 Uschi Eid, Bündnis 90/Die Grünen
 Marga Elser, SPD
 Peter Enders, SPD
 Rainer Eppelmann, CDU
 Gernot Erler, SPD
 Petra Ernstberger, SPD
 Jörg van Essen, FDP
 Anke Eymer, CDU

F 
 Ilse Falk, CDU
 Annette Faße, SPD
 Hans Georg Faust, CDU
 Albrecht Feibel, CDU
 Hans-Josef Fell, Bündnis 90/Die Grünen
 Heinrich Fink, PDS
 Ulf Fink, CDU
 Ingrid Fischbach, CDU
 Andrea Fischer, Bündnis 90/Die Grünen
 Axel Fischer, CDU
 Dirk Fischer, CDU
 Joschka Fischer, Bündnis 90/Die Grünen
 Lothar Fischer, SPD
 Ulrike Flach, FDP
 Gabriele Fograscher, SPD
 Iris Follak, SPD
 Norbert Formanski, SPD
 Rainer Fornahl, SPD
 Hans Forster, SPD
 Klaus Francke, CDU
 Herbert Frankenhauser, CSU
 Dagmar Freitag, SPD
 Gisela Frick, FDP
 Paul Friedhoff, FDP
 Gerhard Friedrich_(politician), CSU
 Hans-Peter Friedrich, CSU
 Horst Friedrich, FDP
 Lilo Friedrich, SPD
 Peter Friedrich, SPD
 Harald Friese, SPD
 Erich G. Fritz, CDU
 Jochen-Konrad Fromme, CDU
 Anke Fuchs, SPD
 Ruth Fuchs, PDS
 Hans-Joachim Fuchtel, CDU
 Arne Fuhrmann, SPD
 Rainer Funke, FDP

G 
 Monika Ganseforth, SPD
 Fred Gebhardt, PDS
 Jürgen Gehb, CDU
 Wolfgang Gehrcke, PDS
 Michaela Geiger, CSU
 Norbert Geis, CSU
 Heiner Geißler, CDU
 Wolfgang Gerhardt, FDP
 Konrad Gilges, SPD
 Georg Girisch, CSU
 Iris Gleicke, SPD
 Michael Glos, CSU
 Günter Gloser, SPD
 Reinhard Göhner, CDU
 Hans-Michael Goldmann, FDP
 Uwe Göllner, SPD
 Katrin Göring-Eckardt, Bündnis 90/Die Grünen
 Peter Götz, CDU
 Wolfgang Götzer, CSU
 Renate Gradistanac, SPD
 Angelika Graf, SPD
 Günter Graf, SPD
 Dieter Grasedieck, SPD
 Klaus Grehn, PDS
 Monika Griefahn, SPD
 Kerstin Griese, SPD
 Rita Grießhaber, Bündnis 90/Die Grünen
 Kurt-Dieter Grill, CDU
 Hermann Gröhe, CDU
 Achim Großmann, SPD
 Wolfgang Grotthaus, SPD
 Manfred Grund, CDU
 Bärbel Grygier, PDS
 Horst Günther, CDU
 Joachim Günther, FDP
 Karlheinz Guttmacher, FDP
 Gregor Gysi, PDS

H 
 Karl Hermann Haack, SPD
 Hans-Joachim Hacker, SPD
 Gerald Häfner, Bündnis 90/Die Grünen
 Klaus Hagemann, SPD
 Carl-Detlev Freiherr von Hammerstein, CDU
 Manfred Hampel, SPD
 Christel Hanewinckel, SPD
 Alfred Hartenbach, SPD
 Anke Hartnagel, SPD
 Gottfried Haschke, CDU
 Klaus Hasenfratz, SPD
 Gerda Hasselfeldt, CSU
 Nina Hauer, SPD
 Klaus Haupt, FDP
 Hansgeorg Hauser, CSU
 Norbert Hauser, CDU
 Helmut Haussmann, FDP
 Klaus-Jürgen Hedrich, CDU
 Helmut Heiderich, CDU
 Hubertus Heil, SPD
 Ursula Heinen-Esser, CDU
 Ulrich Heinrich, FDP
 Manfred Heise, CDU
 Siegfried Helias, CDU
 Detlef Helling, CDU
 Reinhold Hemker, SPD
 Frank Hempel, SPD
 Rolf Hempelmann, SPD
 Barbara Hendricks, SPD
 Hans Jochen Henke, CDU
 Winfried Hermann, Bündnis 90/Die Grünen
 Antje Hermenau, Bündnis 90/Die Grünen
 Gustav Herzog, SPD
 Monika Heubaum, SPD
 Kristin Heyne, Bündnis 90/Die Grünen
 Uwe Hiksch, SPD
 Gisela Hilbrecht, SPD
 Reinhold Hiller, SPD
 Stephan Hilsberg, SPD
 Ernst Hinsken, CSU
 Peter Hintze, CDU
 Walter Hirche, FDP
 Klaus Hofbauer, CSU
 Gerd Höfer, SPD
 Jelena Hoffmann, SPD
 Walter Hoffmann, SPD
 Iris Hoffmann, SPD
 Ulrike Höfken, Bündnis 90/Die Grünen
 Frank Hofmann, SPD
 Martin Hohmann, CDU
 Klaus Holetschek, CSU
 Barbara Höll, PDS
 Josef Hollerith, CSU
 Ingrid Holzhüter, SPD
 Birgit Homburger, FDP
 Karl-Heinz Hornhues, CDU
 Siegfried Hornung, CDU
 Joachim Hörster, CDU
 Eike Hovermann, SPD
 Werner Hoyer, FDP
 Carsten Hübner, PDS
 Christel Humme, SPD
 Hubert Hüppe, CDU
 Michaele Hustedt, Bündnis 90/Die Grünen

I 
 Lothar Ibrügger, SPD
 Barbara Imhof, SPD
 Brunhilde Irber, SPD
 Ulrich Irmer, FDP
 Gabriele Iwersen, SPD

J 
 Peter Jacoby, CDU
 Susanne Jaffke, CDU
 Renate Jäger, SPD
 Georg Janovsky, CDU
 Jann-Peter Janssen, SPD
 Ilse Janz, SPD
 Ulla Jelpke, PDS
 Uwe Jens, SPD
 Rainer Jork, CDU
 Volker Jung, SPD
 Sabine Jünger, PDS
 Gerhard Jüttemann, PDS
 Egon Jüttner, CDU

K 
 Harald Kahl, CDU
 Johannes Kahrs, SPD
 Bartholomäus Kalb, CSU
 Steffen Kampeter, CDU
 Dietmar Kansy, CDU
 Manfred Kanther, CDU
 Irmgard Karwatzki, CDU
 Ulrich Kasparick, SPD
 Sabine Kaspereit, SPD
 Susanne Kastner, SPD
 Volker Kauder, CDU
 Ulrich Kelber, SPD
 Hans-Peter Kemper, SPD
 Evelyn Kenzler, PDS
 Klaus Kinkel, FDP
 Klaus Kirschner, SPD
 Eckart von Klaeden, CDU
 Marianne Klappert, SPD
 Siegrun Klemmer, SPD
 Ulrich Klinkert, CDU
 Hans-Ulrich Klose, SPD
 Heidi Knake-Werner, PDS
 Monika Knoche, Bündnis 90/Die Grünen
 Helmut Kohl, CDU
 Heinrich Leonhard Kolb, FDP
 Manfred Kolbe, CDU
 Walter Kolbow, SPD
 Norbert Königshofen, CDU
 Gudrun Kopp, FDP
 Jürgen Koppelin, FDP
 Fritz Rudolf Körper, SPD
 Eva-Maria Kors, CDU
 Karin Kortmann, SPD
 Hartmut Koschyk, CSU
 Thomas Kossendey, CDU
 Angelika Köster-Loßack, Bündnis 90/Die Grünen
 Anette Kramme, SPD
 Rudolf Kraus, CSU
 Nicolette Kressl, SPD
 Martina Krogmann, CDU
 Volker Kröning, SPD
 Paul Krüger, CDU
 Angelika Krüger-Leißner, SPD
 Horst Kubatschka, SPD
 Ernst Küchler, SPD
 Hermann Kues, CDU
 Werner Kuhn, CDU
 Helga Kühn-Mengel, SPD
 Ute Kumpf, SPD
 Konrad Kunick, SPD
 Uwe Küster, SPD
 Rolf Kutzmutz, PDS

L 
 Werner Labsch, SPD
 Oskar Lafontaine, SPD
 Christine Lambrecht, SPD
 Karl A. Lamers, CDU
 Karl Lamers, CDU
 Norbert Lammert, CDU
 Helmut Lamp, CDU
 Brigitte Lange, SPD
 Christian Lange, SPD
 Detlev von Larcher, SPD
 Paul Laufs, CDU
 Karl-Josef Laumann, CDU
 Christine Lehder, SPD
 Waltraud Lehn, SPD
 Robert Leidinger, SPD
 Steffi Lemke, Bündnis 90/Die Grünen
 Vera Lengsfeld, CDU
 Ina Lenke, FDP
 Klaus Lennartz, SPD
 Werner Lensing, CDU
 Elke Leonhard, SPD
 Peter Letzgus, CDU
 Sabine Leutheusser-Schnarrenberger, FDP
 Eckhart Lewering, SPD
 Ursula Lietz, CDU
 Walter Link, CDU
 Eduard Lintner, CSU
 Helmut Lippelt, Bündnis 90/Die Grünen
 Heidi Lippmann, PDS
 Klaus Lippold, CDU
 Manfred Lischewski, CDU
 Wolfgang Lohmann, CDU
 Götz-Peter Lohmann, SPD
 Christa Lörcher, SPD
 Gabriele Lösekrug-Möller, SPD
 Reinhard Loske, Bündnis 90/Die Grünen
 Erika Lotz, SPD
 Ursula Lötzer, PDS
 Julius Louven, CDU
 Christine Lucyga, SPD
 Christa Luft, PDS
 Heidemarie Lüth, PDS
 Michael Luther, CDU

M 
 Dieter Maaß, SPD
 Erich Maaß, CDU
 Pia Maier, PDS
 Winfried Mante, SPD
 Dirk Manzewski, SPD
 Tobias Marhold, SPD
 Lothar Mark, SPD
 Angela Marquardt, PDS
 Erwin Marschewski, CDU
 Ulrike Mascher, SPD
 Christoph Matschie, SPD
 Ingrid Matthäus-Maier, SPD
 Heide Mattischeck, SPD
 Martin Mayer, CSU
 Markus Meckel, SPD
 Wolfgang Meckelburg, CDU
 Ulrike Mehl, SPD
 Michael Meister, CDU
 Angela Merkel, CDU
 Ulrike Merten, SPD
 Angelika Mertens, SPD
 Friedrich Merz, CDU
 Oswald Metzger, Bündnis 90/Die Grünen
 Jürgen Meyer, SPD
 Hans Michelbach, CSU
 Meinolf Michels, CDU
 Ursula Mogg, SPD
 Jürgen Möllemann, FDP
 Christoph Moosbauer, SPD
 Siegmar Mosdorf, SPD
 Bernward Müller, CDU
 Christian Müller_(politician), SPD
 Elmar Müller, CDU
 Gerd Müller, CSU
 Jutta Müller, SPD
 Kerstin Müller, Bündnis 90/Die Grünen
 Klaus Müller_(politician), Bündnis 90/Die Grünen
 Manfred Müller, PDS
 Michael Müller_(politician, 1948), SPD
 Franz Müntefering, SPD

N 
 Winfried Nachtwei, Bündnis 90/Die Grünen
 Andrea Nahles, SPD
 Rosel Neuhäuser, PDS
 Bernd Neumann, CDU
 Gerhard Neumann, SPD
 Volker Neumann, SPD
 Christa Nickels, Bündnis 90/Die Grünen
 Dirk Niebel, FDP
 Edith Niehuis, SPD
 Rolf Niese, SPD
 Dietmar Nietan, SPD
 Claudia Nolte, CDU
 Günther Friedrich Nolting, FDP
 Günter Nooke, CDU

O 
 Franz Obermeier, CSU
 Günter Oesinghaus, SPD
 Eckhard Ohl, SPD
 Leyla Onur, SPD
 Manfred Opel, SPD
 Holger Ortel, SPD
 Friedhelm Ost, CDU
 Adolf Ostertag, SPD
 Christine Ostrowski, PDS
 Eduard Oswald, CSU
 Hans-Joachim Otto, FDP
 Norbert Otto, CDU
 Cem Özdemir, Bündnis 90/Die Grünen

P 
 Kurt Palis, SPD
 Albrecht Papenroth, SPD
 Detlef Parr, FDP
 Petra Pau, PDS
 Peter Paziorek, CDU
 Willfried Penner, SPD
 Martin Pfaff, SPD
 Georg Pfannenstein, SPD
 Anton Pfeifer, CDU
 Johannes Pflug, SPD
 Friedbert Pflüger, CDU
 Beatrix Philipp, CDU
 Eckhart Pick, SPD
 Cornelia Pieper, FDP
 Ronald Pofalla, CDU
 Ruprecht Polenz, CDU
 Joachim Poß, SPD
 Marlies Pretzlaff, CDU
 Simone Probst, Bündnis 90/Die Grünen
 Bernd Protzner, CSU
 Dieter Pützhofen, CDU

R 
 Thomas Rachel, CDU
 Hans Raidel, CSU
 Peter Ramsauer, CSU
 Helmut Rauber, CDU
 Peter Rauen, CDU
 Karin Rehbock-Zureich, SPD
 Christa Reichard, CDU
 Katherina Reiche, CDU
 Carola Reimann, SPD
 Erika Reinhardt, CDU
 Margot von Renesse, SPD
 Renate Rennebach, SPD
 Hans-Peter Repnik, CDU
 Bernd Reuter, SPD
 Günter Rexrodt, FDP
 Edelbert Richter, SPD
 Klaus Riegert, CDU
 Heinz Riesenhuber, CDU
 Reinhold Robbe, SPD
 Franz Romer, CDU
 Hannelore Rönsch, CDU
 Heinrich-Wilhelm Ronsöhr, CDU
 Gudrun Roos, SPD
 Klaus Rose, CSU
 René Röspel, SPD
 Uwe-Jens Rössel, PDS
 Kurt Rossmanith, CSU
 Ernst Dieter Rossmann, SPD
 Claudia Roth, Bündnis 90/Die Grünen
 Adolf Roth, CDU
 Michael Roth, SPD
 Birgit Roth, SPD
 Norbert Röttgen, CDU
 Gerhard Rübenkönig, SPD
 Christian Ruck, CSU
 Volker Rühe, CDU
 Marlene Rupprecht, SPD
 Jürgen Rüttgers, CDU

S 
 Thomas Sauer, SPD
 Anita Schäfer, CDU
 Hansjörg Schäfer, SPD
 Gudrun Schaich-Walch, SPD
 Rudolf Scharping, SPD
 Wolfgang Schäuble, CDU
 Hartmut Schauerte, CDU
 Christine Scheel, Bündnis 90/Die Grünen
 Bernd Scheelen, SPD
 Hermann Scheer, SPD
 Siegfried Scheffler, SPD
 Heinz Schemken, CDU
 Christina Schenk, PDS
 Karl-Heinz Scherhag, CDU
 Gerhard Scheu, CSU
 Irmingard Schewe-Gerigk, Bündnis 90/Die Grünen
 Horst Schild, SPD
 Otto Schily, SPD
 Norbert Schindler, CDU
 Rezzo Schlauch, Bündnis 90/Die Grünen
 Dietmar Schlee, CDU
 Dieter Schloten, SPD
 Bernd Schmidbauer, CDU
 Horst Schmidbauer, SPD
 Albert Schmidt_(politician), Bündnis 90/Die Grünen
 Andreas Schmidt, CDU
 Christian Schmidt, CSU
 Dagmar Schmidt, SPD
 Frank Schmidt, SPD
 Joachim Schmidt, CDU
 Silvia Schmidt, SPD
 Ulla Schmidt, SPD
 Wilhelm Schmidt_(politician), SPD
 Edzard Schmidt-Jortzig, FDP
 Regina Schmidt-Zadel, SPD
 Heinz Schmitt, SPD
 Hans Peter Schmitz, CDU
 Michael von Schmude, CDU
 Carsten Schneider, SPD
 Emil Schnell, SPD
 Birgit Schnieber-Jastram, CDU
 Andreas Schockenhoff, CDU
 Walter Schöler, SPD
 Olaf Scholz, SPD
 Rupert Scholz, CDU
 Karsten Schönfeld, SPD
 Reinhard von Schorlemer, CDU
 Fritz Schösser, SPD
 Ottmar Schreiner, SPD
 Gerhard Schröder, SPD
 Mathias Schubert, SPD
 Erika Schuchardt, CDU
 Richard Schuhmann, SPD
 Wolfgang Schulhoff, CDU
 Brigitte Schulte, SPD
 Reinhard Schultz, SPD
 Volkmar Schultz, SPD
 Gerhard Schulz, CDU
 Werner Schulz, Bündnis 90/Die Grünen
 Ilse Schumann, SPD
 Gustav-Adolf Schur, PDS
 Ewald Schurer, SPD
 Gerhard Schüßler, FDP
 Werner Schuster, SPD
 Dietmar Schütz, SPD
 Diethard Schütze, CDU
 Irmgard Schwaetzer, FDP
 Clemens Schwalbe, CDU
 Angelica Schwall-Düren, SPD
 Ernst Schwanhold, SPD
 Rolf Schwanitz, SPD
 Christian Schwarz-Schilling, CDU
 Wilhelm Josef Sebastian, CDU
 Horst Seehofer, CSU
 Marita Sehn, FDP
 Marion Seib, CSU
 Bodo Seidenthal, SPD
 Ilja Seifert, PDS
 Heinz Seiffert, CDU
 Rudolf Seiters, CDU
 Gudrun Serowiecki, FDP
 Bernd Siebert, CDU
 Werner Siemann, CDU
 Erika Simm, SPD
 Christian Simmert, Bündnis 90/Die Grünen
 Johannes Singhammer, CSU
 Sigrid Skarpelis-Sperk, SPD
 Hermann Otto Solms, FDP
 Cornelie Sonntag-Wolgast, SPD
 Wieland Sorge, SPD
 Bärbel Sothmann, CDU
 Wolfgang Spanier, SPD
 Margarete Späte, CDU
 Margrit Spielmann, SPD
 Jörg-Otto Spiller, SPD
 Carl-Dieter Spranger, CSU
 Max Stadler, FDP
 Ditmar Staffelt, SPD
 Antje-Marie Steen, SPD
 Wolfgang Steiger, CDU
 Erika Steinbach, CDU
 Kersten Steinke, PDS
 Christian Sterzing, Bündnis 90/Die Grünen
 Wolfgang von Stetten, CDU
 Ludwig Stiegler, SPD
 Rolf Stöckel, SPD
 Andreas Storm, CDU
 Dorothea Störr-Ritter, CDU
 Max Straubinger, CSU
 Rita Streb-Hesse, SPD
 Matthäus Strebl, CSU
 Hans-Christian Ströbele, Bündnis 90/Die Grünen
 Reinhold Strobl, SPD
 Thomas Strobl, CDU
 Peter Struck, SPD
 Michael Stübgen, CDU
 Joachim Stünker, SPD
 Rita Süssmuth, CDU

T 
 Joachim Tappe, SPD
 Jörg Tauss, SPD
 Jella Teuchner, SPD
 Gerald Thalheim, SPD
 Carl-Ludwig Thiele, FDP
 Wolfgang Thierse, SPD
 Dieter Thomae, FDP
 Franz Thönnes, SPD
 Susanne Tiemann, CDU
 Uta Titze-Stecher, SPD
 Edeltraut Töpfer, CDU
 Jürgen Trittin, Bündnis 90/Die Grünen
 Adelheid D. Tröscher, SPD
 Jürgen Türk, FDP

U 
 Hans-Peter Uhl, CSU
 Gunnar Uldall, CDU
 Hans-Eberhard Urbaniak, SPD

V 
 Arnold Vaatz, CDU
 Rüdiger Veit, SPD
 Günter Verheugen, SPD
 Simone Violka, SPD
 Ute Vogt, SPD
 Antje Vollmer, Bündnis 90/Die Grünen
 Ludger Volmer, Bündnis 90/Die Grünen
 Angelika Volquartz, CDU
 Sylvia Voß, Bündnis 90/Die Grünen
 Andrea Voßhoff, CDU

W 
 Hans-Georg Wagner, SPD
 Theodor Waigel, CSU
 Hedi Wegener, SPD
 Konstanze Wegner, SPD
 Wolfgang Weiermann, SPD
 Reinhard Weis, SPD
 Matthias Weisheit, SPD
 Gerald Weiß, CDU
 Peter Weiß, CDU
 Gunter Weißgerber, SPD
 Gert Weisskirchen, SPD
 Ernst Ulrich von Weizsäcker, SPD
 Jochen Welt, SPD
 Rainer Wend, SPD
 Hildegard Wester, SPD
 Guido Westerwelle, FDP
 Lydia Westrich, SPD
 Inge Wettig-Danielmeier, SPD
 Margrit Wetzel, SPD
 Annette Widmann-Mauz, CDU
 Helmut Wieczorek, SPD
 Jürgen Wieczorek, SPD
 Norbert Wieczorek, SPD
 Heidemarie Wieczorek-Zeul, SPD
 Dieter Wiefelspütz, SPD
 Heino Wiese, SPD
 Heinz Wiese, CDU
 Klaus Wiesehügel, SPD
 Helmut Wilhelm, Bündnis 90/Die Grünen
 Hans-Otto Wilhelm, CDU
 Gert Willner, CDU
 Klaus-Peter Willsch, CDU
 Bernd Wilz, CDU
 Brigitte Wimmer, SPD
 Willy Wimmer, CDU
 Matthias Wissmann, CDU
 Engelbert Wistuba, SPD
 Barbara Wittig, SPD
 Werner Wittlich, CDU
 Wolfgang Wodarg, SPD
 Verena Wohlleben, SPD
 Dagmar Wöhrl, CSU
 Aribert Wolf, CSU
 Hanna Wolf, SPD
 Margareta Wolf, Bündnis 90/Die Grünen
 Winfried Wolf, PDS
 Waltraud Wolff, SPD
 Heidemarie Wright, SPD
 Elke Wülfing, CDU
 Peter Kurt Würzbach, CDU

Z 
 Uta Zapf, SPD
 Wolfgang Zeitlmann, CSU
 Benno Zierer, CSU
 Wolfgang Zöller, CSU
 Christoph Zöpel, SPD
 Peter Zumkley, SPD

See also 
 Politics of Germany
 List of Bundestag Members

14